Canterbury Hockey Club is a field hockey club based in Canterbury, England. The club was established in 1901 and the home ground is located just outside Canterbury at Polo Farm. There are two water-based pitches, a topped sand based pitch, purpose built Indoor Hockey Centre and a clubhouse.

The men's 1st XI play in the Men's England Hockey League and the ladies 1st XI play in the Women's England Hockey League.  The large club fields ten men's sides, five ladies' sides, and various youth sides.

Teams

Men's
1st XI
2nd XI
Pilgrims
3s
4s
Millers
5s
Griffins
Squires
Friars

Ladies
1st XI
2s
2As
3s
3As

Juniors
The club has a large number of junior teams from U18s to U8s. These teams represent the club in various competitions across Kent and the rest of the country.

Major honors
 1999–00 Men's League Champions
 2002–03 Women's Cup Winners
 2004-05 Women's Super Cup Winners
2006-07 Men's Premier Indoor Champions
 Five times Women's League Runner-Up & 1998 Men's League Runner-up
 2016-17 Men's Cup Runner-up

Notable players

Men's internationals

Women's internationals

References

English field hockey clubs
1901 establishments in England
Sport in Canterbury
Field hockey clubs established in 1901